King of Egypt was the title used by the ruler of Egypt between 1922 and 1951. When the United Kingdom issued the Unilateral Declaration of Egyptian Independence on 28 February 1922, thereby ending its protectorate over Egypt, Egypt's Sultan Fouad I issued a decree on 15 March 1922 whereby he adopted the title of King of Egypt. It has been reported that the title change was due not only to Egypt's newly independent status, but also to Fouad I's desire to be accorded the same title as the newly installed rulers of the newly created kingdoms of Hejaz, Syria and Iraq. The only other monarch to be styled King of Egypt was Fouad I's son Farouk I, whose title was changed to King of Egypt and the Sudan in October 1951 following the Wafdist government's unilateral abrogation of the Anglo-Egyptian Treaty of 1936. The monarchy was abolished on 18 June 1953 following the Egyptian Revolution of 1952 and the establishment of a republic. The then-king, the infant Fuad II of Egypt (Farouk having abdicated following the revolution), went into exile in Italy.

The rulers of ancient Egypt may be described using the title King (a translation of the Egyptian word nsw) or pharaoh (derived from pr ˤ3).

See also
Pharaoh
List of pharaohs
List of monarchs of the Muhammad Ali Dynasty
Lists of rulers of Egypt

References

Egyptian monarchy